Jameh Mosque of Kerman is a mosque located in Kerman, Iran. The mosque was built at the time of Mubariz al-Din Muhammad, Muzaffarids, in the 14th century. The western side of the building features a high portal which has been decorated with decorative tile-works and a watch tower.

References 

Mosques in Iran
Mosque buildings with domes
Tourist attractions in Kerman Province
Buildings and structures in Kerman Province
National works of Iran
Kerman